Marie-Louise Pleiss, stage name Ria Bartok (28 January 1943 Einbeck, Germany – 2 March 1970 Paris), was a French singer of yéyé pop songs.

Bartok was the daughter of an opera singer. She saw her first success at the age of 20 with the song "Parce que j'ai revu François". Part of the yéyé wave of the 1960s, she faced difficulty making herself known to the public at large. She was overshadowed by other singers of her generation such as Johnny Hallyday, Sylvie Vartan, and Richard Anthony. Bartok nevertheless saw her greatest success with the song "Et quelque chose me dit".

Her last concert in France was on 13 May 1967. She died suddenly in a fire in 1970 at the age of 27.

Selected discography 
 "Parce que j'ai revu François" (after Johnny Hallyday Parce que j'ai revu Linda) – her first success at the age of 20
 "Écoute mon cœur"
 "J'y pense tout bas"
 "C'est bien fait"
 "Et quelque chose me dit" – her best known song
 "N'importe quoi"
 "Un baiser"
 "Ce monde" (also sung by Richard Anthony)
 "Diggedle Boeing" (also released in English as "See if I Care")

References

1943 births
1970 deaths
French pop singers
Yé-yé singers
Deaths from fire
20th-century French women singers